Leuconostoc pseudomesenteroides is an intrinsically vancomycin-resistant, Gram-positive, coccus-shaped bacterium, with type strain NCDO 768.

References

Further reading

Cappelli, Elisabete A., et al. "Leuconostoc pseudomesenteroides as a cause of nosocomial urinary tract infections." Journal of Clinical Microbiology 37.12 (1999): 4124–4126.

External links
LPSN

Type strain of Leuconostoc pseudomesenteroides at BacDive -  the Bacterial Diversity Metadatabase

Lactobacillaceae
Bacteria described in 1989